The Dinard Ladies Open was a women's professional golf tournament played as part of the LET Access Series, held between 2010 and 2015 in Saint-Briac-sur-Mer, Brittany, France.

The tournament was played at the Dinard course, the second oldest in France after Pau, and one of the oldest in continental Europe. Laid out along the English Channel with sea views from all 18 holes, it was founded in 1887 by a small colony of British residents.

In 2012 Carly Booth won the tournament in a playoff for her first professional victory, before she went on to claim two further wins on the LET, where she finished the year 5th on the Order of Merit.

Winners

^Shortened to 36 holes due to weather

References

External links

Dinard Ladies Open
Defunct golf tournaments in France